Crime Scene: The Texas Killing Fields is a 2022 Netflix limited docuseries directed by Jessica Dimmock. It is the third installment in the Crime Scene documentary series, following Crime Scene: The Times Square Killer. The true crime series is centered around the unsolved murders of four women in Texas in the 80s and 90s in an area known as the Texas Killing Fields, located in League City, Texas. It was released on November 29, 2022.

As of December 4, 2022, it was rated as the top docuseries on Netflix, with 23,880,000 total hours viewed.

Reception
On Rotten Tomatoes, all 3 critics' reviews were positive.

References

External links
 
 
 

2022 American television series debuts
2022 American television series endings
2022 American television seasons
2020s American documentary television series
Documentary television series about crime in the United States
English-language Netflix original programming
Netflix original documentary television series
Television series based on actual events
Television series created by Joe Berlinger
League City, Texas